Ibraheem S. Samirah (born August 20, 1991) is an American dentist and politician. He served as a member of the Virginia House of Delegates from the 86th district. Samirah was re-elected to a full term on November 5, 2019. He is a Democrat. He was the youngest elected legislator in the Commonwealth of Virginia. In June 2021, he was defeated in the Democratic primary for re-election by Irene Shin.

Early life and education 
Samirah was born in Chicago on August 20, 1991, a first generation U.S. citizen, to Jordanian-Palestinian immigrant parents. Samirah's grandparents were Palestinian refugees. Growing up in Chicago area, he "enjoyed a typical American childhood—watching basketball in the bleachers, riding bikes with my brothers, and then getting around to my homework". His mother was pursuing a special education master's degree while working as a teacher and his father was completing a PhD in economics and public policy, working as an activist, becoming a community leader and registering Muslim voters. 

When he was in middle school, he and his family were forced to reunite in Jordan due to the George W. Bush administration's decision to deny Samirah's father re-entry into the United States. Attorney General, John Ashcroft, deemed Samirah's father a security risk in 2003 when his father was returning home to Chicago after visiting Samirah's sick grandmother, forcing his father to go back to the country from whence he had last departed, Jordan.
 Samirah, watching the evening news the night he found out he couldn't be with his father, remembers looking lost and thinking “I don’t know what the hell just happened.” At the time he recalls "playing for his middle-school basketball team and having his first crush on a classmate" when he was dealing with the newfound situation of being separated from his father.

Eventually, he was exiled from Chicago to Amman where he and his family lived with Samirah's grandparents. He spoke with a thick American accent. In an interview with The Washingtonian''', Samirah says “It was a very depressing time for at least two years.”

Eleven years after being denied re-entry, Samirah's father was granted readmittance to the United States in 2014 after the United States Court of Appeals for the Seventh Circuit ruled that Samirah's father had a right to return to the United States. Growing up, Samirah loved playing basketball and dreamed of playing in the NBA.

Samirah says he "worked hard in school so I could one day return to the country I loved." In an interview with Her Campus'', Samirah noted how "It’s hard [being brought up] Palestinian. Your parents tell you to not get involved in something that may harm your life [trajectory], like activism. But it keeps me real with myself, keeps me close to my emotions and my people by seeing them at events. It actually kept me focused on studying, since it could have cost me my education."

Samirah graduated with a Bachelor of Arts degree in government and political science from American University in 2013, where, though Muslim, he was a member of the historically Jewish fraternity Sigma Alpha Mu, attracted by the chapter's progressive values and "respect for diversity." During his time at American University, he founded the first ever college chapter for Jewish Voice for Peace at American University. While a student, Samirah made posts on social media platforms which contained anti-Israel themes. In response to related controversy, Samirah apologized in a February 8, 2019 statement for "ill-chosen words" that "added to the pain of the Jewish community."

He earned his Doctor of Dental Medicine (DMD) from the Henry M. Goldman School of Dental Medicine at Boston University in 2017. While he attended dental school, Samirah was a member of the American Dental Association, Black Lives Matter, Students for Justice in Palestine, and Jewish Voice for Peace.

Virginia House of Delegates

Elections 
After Jennifer Boysko was elected to the Senate of Virginia in 2019, Samirah ran in the special election to complete the remainder of her term in the Virginia House of Delegates.

Samirah defeated Republican Gregg G. Nelson and independent Connie H. Hutchinson, receiving 60% of the vote to Nelson's 34% and Hutchinson's 6%, on February 19, 2019. He was sworn in the next day, becoming the second Muslim elected to the Virginia General Assembly after fellow Democrat Sam Rasoul in 2014.

State Delegate Samirah was reelected on November 5, 2019 in the general election for the Virginia House of Delegates. In that election, Samirah ran unopposed.

In June 2021, he was defeated in the Democratic primary by non-profit organizer Irene Shin. Shin outraised Samirah by more than $100,000 and received the endorsement of several local elected officials, including Boysko.

Policy positions 
Samirah is a Democrat, that says he serves in Virginia's House of Delegates "to give back—by helping families stay healthy, with more opportunities to succeed, and more time to spend together." Samirah clarifies his policy positioning by saying he strives to "bring Virginia into a new decade of progress by building an equitable, 21st century economy for the Commonwealth. As a dentist, [he] sees improving public health as the central issue that touches all others. From housing affordability to women’s empowerment, to education and criminal justice, [his] ultimate goal is to create healthier, happier, and more efficient communities. [He] works to build the winning coalitions to do just that, and make Virginia a better place for all by lifting up those at the margins."

Women's rights 

Samirah supports a woman's right to choose what they want to do with their body. Samirah supports codifying and expanding abortion rights. Samirah voted to pass the Equal Rights Amendment to achieve gender pay equity for the entire nation, casting a deciding vote to allow it to be ratified into the Constitution of the United States.

Energy and the environment 

Samirah supports enacting a Green New Deal at the state level. In 2020, he patroned the "Green New Deal Act" proposal which would ban the approval of any new fossil-fuel-driven power plants or refineries in Virginia. It would mandate that at least 80% of the electricity sold in the state be from solar, wind, or hydropower by 2028. The bill would also require increased energy efficiency in buildings. It was co-patroned by fellow Democrats Jennifer Carroll-Foy, Elizabeth Guzman, Lashrecse Aird, Joshua G. Cole, Patrick Hope, Clinton Jenkins, Kaye Kory, Barbara Favola, Danica Roem and Sam Rasoul.

In 2021, Samirah endorsed the DC branch of the environmental organization Sunrise Movement's decision to refuse to work with any coalition that included "Zionist" members, specifically naming three Jewish organizations as deserving of expulsion from progressive coalition spaces: The National Council of Jewish Women, the Jewish Council for Public Affairs, and the Religious Action Center of Reform Judaism. Del. Samirah accused the organizations of having engaged in "Zionist Supremacist co-opting of enviro-justice organizing, including the fight for voting rights for all" and claimed that Israel, through the Mossad, "creates fossil fuel wars using malicious intel" (including the second Iraq War).

Gun rights 

Samirah supports gun control.

Electoral reform 

In the 2019 session, Samirah voted in favor of the proposed amendment to the Virginia constitution to create a permanent bipartisan commission for redistricting. In the 2020 session, Samirah backed a bill introduced by state Senator Louise Lucas to allow for expanded absentee voting and recognize election day as a state holiday. Samirah supports adopting automatic voter registration. Samirah supports entering Virginia into the National Popular Vote Interstate Compact, which would pledge our electoral college votes to whoever wins the popular vote in presidential elections. Samirah supports restoring the right to vote to ex-felons.

Marijuana legalization 

Samirah supports legalizing cannabis for recreational use.

Health care 

Samirah favors universal health care at the state level.

Labor relations 

Samirah supports expanding union and worker rights such as removing Virginia's right-to-work law.

Zoning reform 

He supports using state legislation to preempt local zoning ordinances to allow for more multi-family residential, high-density developments on properties currently zoned for single-family detached homes only. Samirah's proposed law would allow property owners to convert their properties from single-family units to two-family duplexes, townhouses, or cottages in both established and new neighborhoods without going through the existing local processes for rezoning a residential property.

Protesting 

On July 30, 2019, Samirah was escorted out of a speech by Trump in Jamestown, Virginia after disrupting the event by standing up and waving card signs consisting of the words "Deport Hate," "Reunite My Family," and "Go Back to Your Corrupted Home." He opposes civility in defense of racism or bigotry, stating, "To the critics of incivility... I say it's time to think critically about whom such decorum has traditionally served: the white, wealthy, and comfortable."

Electoral history

Personal life 
Samirah lives in Herndon, Virginia.

References

External links
 

Living people
People from Herndon, Virginia
Politicians from Chicago
American politicians of Palestinian descent
American dentists
Democratic Party members of the Virginia House of Delegates
American Muslims
21st-century American politicians
American University alumni
Boston University alumni
1991 births